The Strong-Willed Pig (April 2007 – June 16, 2021), was a pig originally belonging to Wan Xingming, a villager in Tuanshan Village, Longmenshan Town, Pengzhou City, Chengdu City.  On May 12, 2008, the Wenchuan earthquake occurred and the pig was buried under rubble for 36 days but amazingly survived on just charcoal and rainwater. On June 17, 2008, the pig was rescued and its weight was found to have dropped from 150 kg to 50 kg.   The pig became a symbol of hope, fortitude and resilience.   He was "revered for his heroism."

Biography
After the Wenchuan earthquake, Jianchuan Museum adopted the pig, and the curator, Fan Jianchuan, gave it two names: the nickname "36 Wa'er" and the formal name "Strong-Willed Pig". 

In September 2011, Chinese scientists cloned the Strong-Willed Pig.

In the late stages of its life
On May 1, 2021, Fan Jianchuan stated that "the situation of Strong-Willed Pig is terrible". On the 10th, the Jianchuan Museum said that the pig had entered the final stage of its life.

Death
On June 16, 2021, Strong-Willed Pig died at Jianchuan Museum Cluster at the age of 14 due to old age and exhaustion. On Weibo there were 430 million views of the hashtag "Strong-Willed Pig has died".

References

2007 animal births
2021 animal deaths
2008 Sichuan earthquake
Individual animals in China
Individual pigs